The Suspects (French: Les suspects) is a 1974 French-Italian crime drama film directed by Michel Wyn and starring Mimsy Farmer, Paul Meurisse and Michel Bouquet.

Cast
 Mimsy Farmer as Candice Strasberg 
 Paul Meurisse as Laurent Kirchner 
 Michel Bouquet as Procureur Delarue 
 Bruno Cremer as Commissaire Bonetti 
 Michael Lonsdale as Le juge Souftries 
 Jacques Fabbri as Commissaire Bretonnet 
 Renaud Verley as Bernard Vauquier 
 Jean-Claude Dauphin as Solnes 
 Marie-Hélène Breillat as Carlyne 
 Marco Perrin as Gabriel 
 Giampiero Albertini as Matteo Gallone 
 Luigi Pistilli as Marcello Angiotti 
 Cirylle Spiga as Campanez 
 Edmund Purdom as Le journaliste américain

References

Bibliography 
 Rège, Philippe. Encyclopedia of French Film Directors, Volume 1. Scarecrow Press, 2009.

External links 
 

1974 films
1974 crime drama films
French crime drama films
Italian crime drama films
1970s French-language films
1970s French films
1970s Italian films